Slyck.com is a defunct website that once produced unique original file sharing news stories, shared aggregated technology news stories from the World Wide Web, and had a user forum.

History

Ray Hoffman began operating Slyck.com as Slyway.com in 2000, which initially was an aggregate news site with some original content, and contained guides to the most popular file-sharing resources at the time, whilst providing statistics of p2p file sharing networks, which included Napster, iMesh, Scour, Usenet and IRC. On the 10th of August 2001, Slyway.com was renamed Slyck.com.

Impact 

Due to the lack of mainstream news coverage on p2p, file sharing and discussion of copyright legislation, Slyck.com had a significant impact as a news site, which New Scientist cited as a "popular file sharing news site", Digital Audio Essentials (2004) referred to Slyck.com as "an excellent resource" for news and information on file sharing, and in Steal This Computer Book 4.0 the site was considered to be "up to date on the latest file sharing technology and news."

Content

The website conducted interviews with file sharing software developers and intellectual property role players, maintaining statistics of P2P file sharing networks, and notably shed light on the developing conflict between file sharing users and intellectual property owners, which covered the legal battle against copyright and intellectual property infringement, such as the takedown of torrent websites like Loki Torrents and Suprnova.org, events that were covered in mainstream media from input by the Intellectual Property owners, which lacked the views of file sharing users, which was represented in the Slyck.com coverage. Notably, Slyck.com extensively covered the Torrent website, The Pirate Bay, and the efforts by Swedish and other national authorities to shut down the website and prosecute the founders/owners of the Pirate Bay.  Slyck.com covered other news topics like roll out of Broadband Internet, new technology and hardware and advances in networking.

Slyck news writers were able to interview notable individuals such as:
 Michael Weiss of StreamCast, Nir Arbel of SoulSeek, and  Pablo Soto of Optisoft S.L  and Kevin Hearn of WinMX were interviewed regarding their software and P2P networks.
 Jon Lech Johansen, nicknamed DVDJon, was interviewed, regarding the DeCSS software that allowed for DVD discs to be played on the Linux Operating System, and allowed for development of duplicating software for DVD discs.
 Muslix64, a software hacker who first circumvented the AACS protection scheme for HD DVD and Blu-ray discs, discussed his reasons for the circumvention of the Digital Rights Management software.
 Dean Garfield, then head of the MPAA's legal team, was interviewed by Nicholas Parr about the MPAA's legal campaign against movie piracy.

Legal threat 

In March 2010, Slyck.com was threatened with legal action  by the controversial UK law firm ACS:Law for defamation, due to comments made by forum users on Slyck.com's UK file sharing Allegations/Lawsuit Discussion sub-forum.  Nothing came of the threatened legal action.

Current status

Slyck.com no longer actively or significantly provides any file sharing news articles, with the last posted news article on file sharing, dated 16 June 2016. As of September 2020, Slyck.com is no longer accessible. The final archival by the wayback machine is dated 27 Feb 2020.

References

External links
 

American technology news websites
File sharing communities
Internet properties established in 2001
File sharing news sites